Corvaja is an Italian surname.

People
Giovanni Corvaja, an Italian jewellery artist
Pietro Corvaja, an Italian mathematician

Places
Palazzo Corvaja, a medieval palace in Sicily